Volodymyr Viktorovych Moroz (born 24 October 1967) is a Ukrainian businessman and politician currently serving as a People's Deputy of Ukraine from Ukraine's 59th electoral district since 29 August 2019. Elected as member of Opposition Platform — For Life, he is currently a member of Restoration of Ukraine since 2022.

Early life and career 
Volodymyr Viktorovych Moroz was born on 24 October 1967 in the city of Kurakhove in the Donetsk Oblast of what was then the Soviet Union. From 1988 to 1992, he worked at Kurakhove Power Station before working as a welder at the "Ecology" company in Kurakhove. In 1997, he became deputy supply director at the Kurakhove-based company DonAhroServis ATZT, and in 2000 he moved to KurakhovEnerhoBud BMU, where he served as deputy director. Moroz left KurakhovEnerhoBud in 2005 to work at PromEnerhoBud TOV, where he also served as deputy director.

Political career 
From 2010 to 2014, Moroz was deputy head of the Kurakhove City Council for housing and communal arrangements and city improvement. From 2014 to 2019, he was head of the Marinka Raion administration. At the same time, he was head of the Petro Poroshenko Bloc in Marinka Raion.

Moroz ran in the 2019 Ukrainian parliamentary election as the candidate of Opposition Platform — For Life (OPZZh) for People's Deputy of Ukraine from Ukraine's 59th electoral district. He was successfully elected, defeating the next-closest candidate, incumbent People's Deputy  with 31.16% of the vote to Sazhko's 21.48%.

People's Deputy of Ukraine 
In the Verkhovna Rada (Ukraine's parliament), Moroz joined the faction of OPZZh, as well as the Verkhovna Rada Committee on Housing and Communal Service and the Verkhovna Rada Energy Committee.

In August 2020, Moroz was one of 47 People's Deputies to bring the matter of electronic income declarations to the Constitutional Court of Ukraine. As a result of the efforts of Moroz and the other deputies, the Constitutional Court chose to abolish electronic income declarations.

In 2022, following the beginning of the Russian invasion of Ukraine and the banning of pro-Russian parties by the government of Ukraine, Moroz joined the Restoration of Ukraine party, made up of former members of OPZZh. The same year, he was among the proponents of a law to prevent local-level lawmakers from being deprived of their mandates due to membership in the OPZZh or other pro-Russian parties.

References 

1967 births
Living people
Ninth convocation members of the Verkhovna Rada
Opposition Platform — For Life politicians
People from Kurakhove